= MRSI =

MRSI may refer to:

- Magnetic resonance spectroscopy imaging, a specialized configuration of magnetic resonance imaging
- Multiple round simultaneous impact, in artillery
